John Kahrs (born 1967/1968) is an American actor, animator and film director.

Kahrs attended NSCAD University, graduating with a Bachelor of Fine Arts degree in 1990.
He began his career at Blue Sky Studios in New York, where he worked as an animator between 1990 and 1997. He later moved to Pixar, where he worked on such films as A Bug's Life, The Incredibles, and Ratatouille. After ten years at Pixar, he moved over to Disney, where he animated on Bolt, Wreck-It Ralph and Frozen, and was an animation supervisor on Tangled.

In 2013, he won an Academy Award for Best Animated Short Film for his 2012 short film, Paperman.

In August 2013, he left Walt Disney Animation Studios to develop his own projects. In January 2014, it was reported that he will direct for Paramount Animation an animated film Shedd. In 2020, he co-directed Over the Moon with Glen Keane, which was released on Netflix the same year. The film was nominated for the Academy Award for Best Animated Feature the following year, but lost to Soul.

Filmography

References

External links
 

American animated film directors
1960s births
Animators from New York (state)
Directors of Best Animated Short Academy Award winners
Living people
NSCAD University alumni
Blue Sky Studios people
Walt Disney Animation Studios people
Pixar people
Year of birth missing (living people)